Below the Heavens is the debut studio album by American hip hop duo Blu & Exile. It was released by Sound in Color on July 17, 2007. It serves as Blu's debut album, while Exile had previously released his solo album Dirty Science and two albums as a member of the duo Emanon.

PopMatters placed it at number 56 on its list of the "Best Albums of 2007". In 2015, it was listed by HipHopDX as one of the "30 Best Underground Hip Hop Albums Since 2000".

Music
Blu provides rap vocals on all of the album's songs, while Exile produces all of the songs and raps just on the bonus track "I Am..". In addition, the album features guest performers Ta'Raach, Aloe Blacc, and Miguel.

Release
Below the Heavens has been reissued twice since going out of print in 2009. In 2011, the album was reissued on Vinyl Call Records. On January 21, 2014, the album was reissued on Fat Beats Records on compact disc with three bonus tracks, limited edition cassette with one bonus track, and vinyl with a 7-inch vinyl with two unreleased instrumentals.

Track listing

Personnel
 Blu – vocals, writer
 Exile – producer, scratches
 DJ Romes – mixing
 Kelly Hibbert – mastering
 Louis Yakich – executive producer, A&R
 Chanshine Nagangzang – executive producer
 Diego Carlin – executive producer

References

External links
 

2007 debut albums
Collaborative albums
Blu (rapper) albums
Albums produced by Exile (producer)